Antonio "Moe" Maestas (born July 6, 1968) is an American attorney and politician from Albuquerque, New Mexico. He is currently serving as a member of the New Mexico Senate from the 26th district, and previously served as a state house representative. Both districts he has represented are located in the West Mesa area of Albuquerque.

Early life and education 
Maestas was born in Albuquerque, New Mexico. After graduating from Valley High School, Maestas he moved to Seattle, Washington and worked at El Centro de la Raza as a community organizer. He earned a Bachelor of Arts in political science and economics from the University of Washington. While attending college, Maestas worked as a sheeter operator at the Stoneway Carton Company. Maestas moved back to Albuquerque in 1995 to attend law school, earning a Juris Doctor from the University of New Mexico School of Law.

Career 
After graduating from law school, Maestas became an Assistant District Attorney at the Bernalillo County, New Mexico District Attorney's Office, where he prosecuted violent crimes. He then opened his own law practice, MoeJustice Law, in 2003.

In 2022, Maestas was appointed to the New Mexico Senate, succeeding Jacob Candelaria. The Bernalillo County Commission selected Marsella Duarte to serve for the remainder of Maestas's House term. Because Maestas remained on the ballot for his House district and ran unopposed, the Commission will select another applicant to serve for the 2023 term.

Elections
2012 Maestas was unopposed for both the June 5, 2012, Democratic primary, winning with 1,888 votes and the November 6, 2012, General election, winning with 8,162 votes.
2006 When District 16 Democratic Representative Harriet Ruiz left the Legislature, Maestas ran in the four-way June 6, 2006, Democratic primary, winning with 668 votes (34.3%) and won the November 7, 2006, General election with 5,703 votes (68.6%) against Republican nominee Storm Field.
2008 Maestas was unopposed for both the June 8, 2008, Democratic primary, winning with 1,948 votes and the November 4, 2008, general election, winning with 9,474 votes.
2010 Maestas was unopposed for both the June 1, 2010, Democratic Primary, winning with 1,561 votes and the November 2, 2010, general election, winning with 5,875 votes.

Personal life 
Maestas is married to Vanessa Alarid, a lobbyist.

References

External links
Official page at the New Mexico Legislature
Law practice site

Antonio Maestas at Ballotpedia
Antonio (Moe) Maestas at the National Institute on Money in State Politics

1968 births
Living people
Democratic Party members of the New Mexico House of Representatives
New Mexico lawyers
Politicians from Albuquerque, New Mexico
University of New Mexico School of Law alumni
University of Washington College of Arts and Sciences alumni
21st-century American politicians